Lina Allemano (born October 20, 1973) is a Canadian musician in the genre of jazz and free improvisation.

Life and career 
Allemano was raised in Edmonton, Alberta. Her mother was a literature scholar and writer and her father is a musician and French teacher. She started playing musical instruments, starting with her brother's old trumpet. She mentioned early in her musical career that she identified herself as a trumpet player. 

Her musical journey began at the age of ten, with her first musical experience being with the trumpet. Music ran deep in her family as it was her father, who familiarized her with jazz. When she was 12, she began to take classical lessons. Her first club concert was at the age of 15. For her education, she moved from Edmonton to Toronto in 1993, where she presently resides. 

She first began performing with Howard Johnson, Don Byron, Dave Holland, Mike Murley and Joe Lovano. She was invited by Dave Douglas to the Festival of New Trumpet Music in New York City, where she appeared on the scene with Ingrid Jensen and drew the attention of Down Beat as seen in the article "25 Trumpeters for the Future: A New Generation of Trumpeters Pave the Way for Jazz's Next Innovations". Allemano's quartet Lina Allemano Four performs free jazz and has released six albums. In 2012, she toured Europe with the group. In 2014 she appeared in Europe with Achim Kaufmann and Christian Weber. She currently splits her time between Berlin and Toronto.

She composes pieces which have been described as both "[complex] and [having a sense of] anarchic freedom." She also leads the improvisation ensemble Titanium Riot with members including Ryan Driver (analog synthesizer), Rob Clutton (bass guitar) and Nick Fraser (Percussion). Other notable work she has done is in her performances with The Paul Read Orchestra, Tim Posgate Horn Band, Cluttertones, The Jane Fair/Rosemary Galloway quintet, The Neufeld-Occhipienti Jazz Orchestra and as a sidewoman for groups with Marianne Trudel, Achilla Orru, Rob Clutton, Victor Bateman and Tania Gill. Additionally, she has appeared on more than 40 albums.

Partial discography
Leader or Co-Leader

 Dikeman/Allemano/Svirsky/Baggiani, The 2nd Path to NowHere, Flea Boy Records (Amsterdam) 2018
Lina Allemano's Titanium Riot, Squish It!, Lumo Records 2017 [Produced by Lina Allemano]
 Lina Allemano Four, Sometimes Y, Lumo Records 2017 [Produced by Lina Allemano]
 Glamour Nails (Justin Haynes/Lina Allemano), Glamour Nails, Bandcamp 2016
 Lina Allemano's Titanium Riot, Kiss The Brain, Lumo Records 2014 [Produced by Lina Allemano]
 Lina Allemano Four, Live at the Tranzac, Lumo Records 2012 [Produced by Lina Allemano]
 Lina Allemano Four, Jargon, Lumo Records 2010 [Produced by Lina Allemano]
 Lina Allemano Four, Gridjam, Lumo Records 2008 [Produced by Lina Allemano]
 Lina Allemano Four, Pinkeye, Lumo Records 2006 [Produced by Lina Allemano]
 Lina Allemano Four, Concentric, Lumo Records 2003 [Produced by Lina Allemano]
 William Carn / Lina Allemano, Old Souls, Carn-Allemano Productions 1998
As a Sideperson

Sideperson

 Harry Vetro's Northern Ranger, Northern Ranger, 2018
 The Cluttertones, Leeways 2018
 Satoko Fujii Orchestra Berlin, Ninety-Nine Years, Libra Records 2018
 The Cluttertones, Ordinary Joy, Healing Power Records 2015
 Marianne Trudel Septet, Espoir et Autres Pouvoirs, Effendi Records 2011
 Tania Gill, Bolger Station, Barnyard Records 2010
 Paul Read Orchestra, Arc-En-Ciel, Addo Records 2010
Tim Posgate Horn Band Featuring Howard Johnson, Banjo Hockey, Black Hen 2009
 Tim Posgate Horn Band Featuring Howard Johnson, Guildwood Records 2005
 Tim Posgate, In the Future of Your Dream, Guildwood Records 2004
 Tim Posgate, Jazzstory, Guildwood Records 2002 
NOJO, Explores the Dark Side of the Moon, True North Records 2010
 NOJO, Highwire, True North Records 2002 
NOJO, You Are Here, True North Records 1998
 Jane Fair/Rosemary Galloway Quintet, Playin' Jane, Independent 2010
 Jane Fair/Rosemary Galloway Quintet, Waltz Out, Independent 2002
 Achilla Orru, Dho-Mach (Sacred Gift), Independent 2004 
Achilla Orru, Te-Kwarro, Independent 2001
 Rob Clutton, Holstein Dream Pageant, Snail Bong Bong Records 2002
 Rob Clutton, Tender Buttons, Snail Bong Bong Records 2000
 Sloan, Navy Blues, Universal/Murderecords 1998
 Royal Wood, A Good Enough Day, DDR/Outside Music 2007
 Victor Bateman, Jazz Guy, 1999
 Lorie Wolf, Taibele and her Demon, 2008

References 

1979 births
Living people
Canadian jazz trumpeters
Canadian jazz composers
Musicians from Edmonton
Women jazz composers
Canadian people of Italian descent
Women trumpeters
Canadian women composers
21st-century trumpeters
21st-century Canadian women musicians